The four-in-hand "mail coach" driving was an equestrian event at the 1900 Summer Olympics. There were 31 entrants listed for the event; all 28 of them are known by name (three entered twice each). The event was won by Georges Nagelmackers (one of the competitors who entered twice) of Belgium. Silver went to Léon Thome and bronze to Jean de Neuflize, both of France.

Sources prior to 1996 often did not list this event as Olympic. The IOC website currently has affirmed a total of 95 medal events, after accepting, as it appears, the recommendation of Olympic historian Bill Mallon regarding events that should be considered "Olympic". These additional events include the mail coach event. (Mallon and de Wael had included this event in their Olympic lists.)

Background

No equestrian events were held at the first modern Olympics in 1896. Five events, including this one, were featured in 1900. Only the show jumping competition would ever be held again after that; this was the only appearance of the mail coach event.

Competition format

The contestants drove mail coaches drawn by four horses each, with the winners determined by a jury. Many of the coaches were driven by their owners. The event took place at the small Place de Breteuil, which was unable to accommodate all 31 coaches simultaneously.

Schedule

Results

Very little is known about the results of the event.

Notes

References

Sources
 International Olympic Committee medal winners database
 De Wael, Herman. Herman's Full Olympians: "Equestrian 1900". Accessed 19 January 2006.
 

Jumping